Menothrips is a genus of thrips in the family Phlaeothripidae.

Species
 Menothrips asiaticus
 Menothrips ebriosus

References

Phlaeothripidae
Thrips
Thrips genera